Bratuku Teruvu  is a 1953 Telugu-language drama film, produced by Kovelamudi Bhaskar Rao under the Bhaskar Productions banner and directed by P. S. Ramakrishna Rao. It stars Akkineni Nageswara Rao and Savitri, with music composed by Ghantasala. The film was also dubbed in Tamil as Bale Raman (1956), remade in Hindi as Jeene Ki Raah (1969) and later in Tamil as Naan Yen Pirandhen (1972).

Plot 
Mohan Rao (Akkineni Nageswara Rao) an unemployed graduate who suffers out of poverty & debts and he is the only person to nourish his huge family. So, he reaches the town in search of a job but could not succeed. Desperate, Mohan understands the reality, so, he changes his attire and starts a new life. Once he gets acquainted with a Zamindar Balasaheb (S. V. Ranga Rao) who appreciates his intelligence and offers him a job provided he should be alone. Mohan joins in the job lying as single to feed his family by. After completion of studies, Balasaheb's daughter Meena (Savitri) returns home and starts loving Mohan. Now the situation becomes delicate, Mohan is in a dichotomy and not able to reveal the truth. On the double, in the village, Mohan's sister Kotamma (Suryakantham) steals the money sent by him. Learning it, their mother leaves the house along with Mohan's family and reach the town in search of Mohan. Accidentally, Mohan meets them and keeps them separately. Eventually, Mohan's house in the village is occasioned by debtors. So, Kotamma & her husband Lokabhi Ramaiah (Relangi) also reach the town and takes shelter at Bhushaiah's house, the friend of Balasaheb. Mohan spots and brings them back. At present, Mohan leads a double life and makes a daring effort to avoid all parties knowing the truth. Meanwhile, Balasaheb makes Meena's marriage proposal with Mohan by luring him with a lot of money for which Mohan gets attracted. He decides to conceive his family so that everyone can live happily. Rest of the story is what happens?

Cast 
 Akkineni Nageshwara Rao as Mohan Rao
 Savitri as Meena
 Sriranjani as Lalitha
 S. V. Ranga Rao as Zamindar Balasaheb
 Relangi as Lokabhi Ramaiah
 Suryakantam as Kotamma

Soundtrack 

Music composed by Ghantasala. Lyrics were written by Samudrala Sr. The song Andame Aanandam is an evergreen blockbuster.

Bale Raman (Tamil) Songs
The music was composed by T. A. Kalyanam. Lyrics were by Kanaga Surabhi. Playback singers are Ghantasala, A. M. Rajah, P. Seenivasan, P. Leela, Jikki, A. P. Komala & Udutha Sarojini.

All the tunes for all the songs  for both languages are the same. The song Engume Aanandham Aanandhame Jeevanin Magarandham is still very popular.

References

External links 
 

1953 films
1950s Telugu-language films
Indian black-and-white films
Telugu films remade in other languages
Films scored by Ghantasala (musician)
Indian drama films
Films directed by P. S. Ramakrishna Rao
1953 drama films
Films scored by C. R. Subbaraman
Films scored by T. A. Kalyanam